The Assinica River is a tributary of the Broadback River flowing west to Rupert Bay south of James Bay. The Assinica River flows into the municipality of Eeyou Istchee Baie-James (municipality) in the Nord-du-Québec administrative region, in Quebec, in Canada.

The group of head lakes of the Assinica River is composed of lakes: Assinica, Comencho, Waposite, Cachisca and Opataca. Forestry is the main economic activity of the sector. Recreational tourism activities come second.

The surface of the Assinica River is usually frozen from early November to mid-May, however, safe ice movement is generally from mid-November to mid-April.

Geography

Toponymy

Of Cree origin, this hydronym means "river filled with stones".

The toponym  'rivière Assinica'  was formalized on December 5, 1968, at the Commission de toponymie du Québec.

See also 

James Bay
Rupert Bay
Broadback River, a watercourse
Eeyou Istchee James Bay (municipality)
Jamésie
List of rivers of Quebec

References

External links 
Fact Sheet of the Commission de toponymie du Québec

Rivers of Nord-du-Québec
Eeyou Istchee James Bay
Broadback River drainage basin